Ölmstad Church is a  medieval era church at  Ölmstad in Jönköping County, Sweden. Ölmstad Church belongs to the  Skärstad-Ölmstad  parish in the Diocese of Växjö of the Church of Sweden.

History
The church is believed to be dated  to 12th century. During the 1400s, the church was burned. During repair, the present choir and sacristy were added. In 1568, the church was plundered  by Danish troops under the leadership of Daniel Rantzau (1529–1569) during  the Northern Seven Years' War and the church was restored.  In 1729, the tower was added to the west side and replaced a former bell tower.

The baptismal font in red sandstone is from the 12th century and is considered to have been made by the workshop of an anonymous stone master referred to as Bestiarius. The triumphal cross  is from the 15th century. The pulpit was manufactured in 1649 by mäster Päder Knutzsson.

The current organ dates to  1885 and was made by Åkerman & Lund Orgelbyggeri of Sundbyberg. Prior organs were made by Georg Hum in 1680 and by Jonas Wistenius (1700-1777) in 1774.

In 2000, the church was refurbished both internally and externally.

Gallery

References

External links
Skärstad-Ölmstad parish website

12th-century churches in Sweden
Churches in Jönköping Municipality
Churches converted from the Roman Catholic Church to the Church of Sweden
Churches in the Diocese of Växjö